Jan Hinnekens (died 2013) was President of the Belgian Catholic Farmers organisation (Dutch: Boerenbond) from 1981 to 1992. In 1992, he was succeeded by Robert Eeckloo. He was a member of the Coudenberg group, a Belgian federalist think tank and of the Trilateral Commission. He is married with Marie Parein and together they have four children.

He died in October 2013.

Sources
 Jan Hinnekens, Ontstaan en groei van het sociaal katholicisme in België, Christelijke organisaties in nieuw perspectief, Antwerpen, 1966

2013 deaths
Belgian businesspeople